These are the official results of the Women's 200 metres event at the 1995 IAAF World Championships in Gothenburg, Sweden. There were a total number of 37 participating athletes, with two semi-finals and five qualifying heats and the final held on Thursday 1995-08-10.

Final

Semi-finals
Held on Thursday 1995-08-10

Qualifying heats
Held on Wednesday 1995-08-09

References
 Results

H
200 metres at the World Athletics Championships
1995 in women's athletics